Charles Egon II, Prince of Fürstenberg (German: Karl Egon II. Fürst zu Fürstenberg; 28 October 179622 October 1854) was a German politician and nobleman. From 1804 to 1806 he was the last sovereign prince of Furstenburg before its mediatisation, whilst still in his minority. He also served as the first-ever vice-president of the Upper Chamber of the Badische Ständeversammlung.

Life

Minority
He was born in Prague, the only son of the Austrian general Karl Aloys zu Fürstenberg and his wife princess Elisabeth von Thurn und Taxis. Soon after his father's death on 25 March 1799 his cousin Charles Gabriel also died aged only fourteen (13 December 1799) - Charles Gabriel had been the last scion of the Bohemian Fürstenberg-Pürglitz line and this left the branch extinct. His uncle Karl Joachim, the last male survivor of the Swabian line, died in 1804, leaving that too extinct. This meant that in 1804 Charles Egon inherited almost all the Fürstenberg possessions except those of the Moravian line, which still had surviving issue.

Charles was only seven years old when he succeeded, so his mother and Landgraf Joachim Egon von Fürstenberg, a distant uncle from the Moravian line, became his guardians and regents, though most of the actual governing was done by Joseph von Laßberg. In 1806 the princedom of Fürstenberg was abolished by the Treaty of the Confederation of the Rhine. Elisabeth and Laßberg tried in vain to get this reversed at the 1814 Congress of Vienna.

He studied at Freiburg and Würzburg. In 1815 he accompanied Prince Schwarzenberg to Paris as staff-officer.

Majority and marriage

On 19 April 1818 he married Amalie of Baden, a daughter of Charles Frederick, Grand Duke of Baden and his second wife Louise Caroline, Countess von Hochberg. Since her mother was a morganatic wife, so too was Amalie - although Charles, Grand Duke of Baden later elevated her to dynastic status (she was his father's half-sister), making her the first "princess" of Baden, which allowed Charles Egon's mother to finally accept the couple as a marriage of equals.

Political life
His estates also meant he sat in the Upper Chamber of the Estates of Württemberg (whose vice-presidency he also held several times) from 1819 and in the Prussian House of Lords from 1850. History records him as a relatively progressive and unbiased for his time. For example, during the full sitting of the German Confederation's landtag in 1831, he played a significant part in getting the upper chamber to approve the Liberal Press Act, put forward by the government under pressure from the lower chamber. This removed censorship, at least for home affairs in Baden. He was also influential in the abolition of tithes and fedual duties.

Charitable work
Charles was also distinguished by his large charities; among other foundations he established a hospital at Donaueschingen. For the industrial development of the country, too, he did much, and proved himself also a notable patron of the arts. His palace of Donaueschingen, with its collections of paintings, engravings and coins, was a centre of culture, where poets, painters and musicians met with princely entertainment.

Issue

With Amalie he had seven children:
 Marie Elisabeth (* 15 March 1819; † 9. April 1897)
 Karl Egon III. (* 4 March 1820; † 15 March 1892)
 Maria Amalia (* 12 February 1821; † 17 January 1899) ∞ 19 April 1845 Viktor I of Hohenlohe-Schillingsfürst, Duke of Ratibor
 Maximilian Egon I (* 29 March 1822; † 27 July 1873)  ∞ 23. Mai 1860 Countess Leontine von Khevenhüller-Metsch
 Marie Henriette (* 16 July 1823; † 19 September 1834)
 Emil Egon (* 12 September 1825; † 15 May 1899) ∞ 31. Mai 1875 Countess Leontine von Khevenhüller-Metsch
 Pauline Wilhelmine (* 11 June 1829; † 3 August 1900) ∞ 15. April 1847 Hugo, Prince of Hohenlohe-Oehringen

Honours
 :
 Grand Cross of the House Order of Fidelity, 1806
 Grand Cross of the Order of the Zähringer Lion, 1817
 : Grand Cross of the Order of the Württemberg Crown, 1826
 :
 Knight of the Order of the Golden Fleece, 1836
 Grand Cross of the Royal Hungarian Order of Saint Stephen, 1849
    Ernestine duchies: Grand Cross of the Saxe-Ernestine House Order, May 1842
  Kingdom of Prussia: Knight of the Order of the Black Eagle, 18 January 1851

References

Bibliography (in German) 
 Karl Siegfried Bader: Fürstin Elisabeth zu Fürstenberg im Kampf um die Erhaltung der Rechte ihres mediatisierten Hauses, in: Schriften des Vereins für Geschichte und Naturgeschichte der Baar und der angrenzenden Landesteile in Donaueschingen, XXIV. Heft 1956, Donaueschingen 1956; S. 119–153. online (PDF; 43,9 MB)
 Friedrich von Weech:  Karl Egon Fürst zu Fürstenberg, in: Friedrich von Weech (Herausgeber): Badische Biographien, Erster Theil, Heidelberg 1875, S. 272–274. (Digitalisat)
 

1796 births
1854 deaths
19th-century German politicians
Members of the Prussian House of Lords
Charles Egon III
Knights of the Golden Fleece of Austria
Grand Crosses of the Order of Saint Stephen of Hungary
German landowners